XDA (formerly known as XDA Developers) is a mobile software development community launched on 20 December 2002. Although discussion primarily revolves around Android, members also talk about many other operating systems and mobile development topics.

Many software and hardware hacks, rooting methods, and other phone and tablet specific tweaks originate from the members of the XDA Forum.

XDA also hosts the XDA Portal — a source for tech news, product reviews, guides, and features — as well as XDA Labs (shut down in 2020), an Android app and repository that acts as a third-party application provider. They were launched in 2010 and 2016, respectively.

Montreal based Valnet Inc. acquired XDA along with four other websites, Pocketnow, AppAdvice, BackyardBoss and Hook&Bullet from Busy Pixel Media in February 2022.

History
XDA-Developers.com was created by Dutch company NAH6 Crypto Products BV and launched on December 20th, 2002. In January 2011, XDA Developers was bought by the US based company JB Online Media, LLC. and subsequently by Canada based Valnet Inc. in February 2022. The name XDA Developers is originally derived from the O2 XDA, which was marketed as a personal digital assistant (PDA) with extra features. 

In 2013, XDA partnered with Swappa to become its official marketplace where users can buy or sell devices.

Website layouts 
Their forum site underwent major redesigns in 2010, 2013, late 2014 (named XDA 2015) and late 2020 (named XDA 2021).

The 2013 layout distinctively indicated the number of active and total registered users at the top right, and the 2015 layout supported responsive web design and was available with a dark-on-light color scheme option.

As of 2020, the website features 3 themes, namely XDA, XDA Dark and XDA Classic. The older layout options for XDA 2013 and XDA 2015 were removed in XDA 2021.

The website transitioned from vBulletin to XenForo on December 1, 2020, along with a major layout redesign, named XDA 2021.

Custom ROM controversy
In February 2009, Microsoft asked XDA Developers to remove all ROMs created by OEMs. In response, a petition was raised and signed by over 10,000 XDA Developers members. The petition was put aside when Microsoft did not continue to pursue the removal of the customized images. Microsoft felt that using custom images based on the ROMs originally provided by them was acceptable as the ROMs work only on specific models and are not portable to devices for which the original ROM was not designed.

Reception
CNET Asia suggested that XDA Developers offers potential solutions to problems with many Android-based mobile devices. In other mobile phone reviews, testers at CNET preferred using XDA Developers' ROMs when carrying out detailed reviews.

See also
 List of Internet forums

References

External links
 

Android (operating system)
Internet forums
Internet properties established in 2003
Windows CE
Windows Mobile